The Saudi conquest of Hejaz or the Second Saudi-Hashemite War, also known as the Hejaz-Nejd War, was a campaign engaged by Saudi Sultan Abdulaziz to take over the Hashemite Kingdom of Hejaz in 1924–25, ending with conquest and incorporation of Hejaz into the Saudi domain.

Background
The 1924 campaign came within the scope of the historic conflict between the Hashemites of Hejaz and the Saudis of Riyadh (Nejd), which had already sparked the First Saudi-Hashemite War in 1919.

Saudi campaign
The pretext for renewed hostilities between Nejd and Hejaz came when the pilgrims from Nejd were denied access to the holy places in Hejaz.<ref name=Al-Khatrash>[http://www.thecherrycreeknews.com/the-hijaz-najd-war-1924-1925/ Fattouh Al-Khatrash. The Hijaz-Najd War (1924 – 1925)]</ref> On 29 August 1924, Abdulaziz began his military campaign against Hejaz by advancing towards Taif, which surrendered without a major struggle. Following the fall of Taif, the Saudi forces and the allied Ikhwan tribesmen moved on Mecca. Sharif Hussein's request for British assistance was denied to him on the pretext of non-intervention in religious disputes. King Hussein bin Ali had meanwhile fled from Mecca to Jeddah, after the assistance request from his son, King Abdullah of Transjordan was denied as well. The city of Mecca fell without struggle on 13 October 1924. The Islamic Conference, held in Riyadh on the 29 October 1924, brought a wide Islamic recognition of Ibn-Saud's jurisdiction over Mecca.

With the advancement of the Saudi forces and blockade imposed on Jeddah, the Hejazi army began to disintegrate. The city of Medina surrendered on 9 December 1925, and Yanbu fell 12 days later. In December 1925 Jeddah was handed to Abdulaziz of Nejd and Saudi forces entering its gates on 8 January 1926, after capitulation and safe passage was negotiated between King bin Ali, Abdulaziz, and the British Consul by the city's ruler Sheikh Abdullah Alireza.

Aftermath
Following the successful takeover over the Kingdom of Hejaz, Abdulaziz was declared as King of Hejaz. The Kingdom was later incorporated into the Kingdom of Nejd and Hejaz with Abdulaziz being the king of both in political union.

King Hussein of Hejaz after stepping down as king has moved to Aqaba to support his son's war efforts which made the British force him into exile to Cyprus, Ali bin Hussein as the King of Hejaz, took office in the middle of losing war effectively with the fall of the Kingdom the dynasty ended up in exile. Hashemites however remained to rule the Emirate of Transjordan and the Kingdom of Iraq.

See also
History of Saudi Arabia
List of modern conflicts in the Middle East

Notes

References

Bibliography
Dalal Al-Harbi. (2003). King Abdulaziz and his Strategies to deal with events: Events of Jeddah''. King Abdulaziz National Library. .

1924 in Saudi Arabia
1925 in Saudi Arabia
Conflicts in 1924
Conflicts in 1925
History of Hejaz
History of Saudi Arabia
Wars involving Saudi Arabia